Vyacheslav Vladimirovich Nikiforov (born 7 October 1966 in Kaliningrad) is a former Russian football player.

He played for the main squad of FC Dinamo Minsk in the USSR Federation Cup.

References

1966 births
Sportspeople from Kaliningrad
Living people
Soviet footballers
FC Baltika Kaliningrad players
FC Dinamo Minsk players
Russian footballers
Russian Premier League players
FC Kristall Smolensk players

Association football midfielders